Las Gorras Blancas (Spanish for "The White Caps") was a group active in the New Mexico Territory and American Southwest in the late 1880s and early 1890s, in response to Anglo-American squatters. Founded in April 1889 by brothers Juan Jose, Pablo, and Nicanor Herrera, with support from vecinos in the New Mexico Territory communities of El Burro, El Salitre, Ojitos Frios, and San Geronimo, in present day San Miguel County.

History
After the northern Mexican frontier became part of the United States in the Treaty of Guadalupe Hidalgo (1848) and the Gadsden Purchase (1853), Anglo Americans began immigrating in large numbers to the newly acquired territories. Anglos began taking lands from both Native Americans and Hispanos by different means, most notably by squatting. Squatters often then sold these lands to land speculators for huge profits, especially after the passing of the 1862 Homestead Act. Hispanos demanded that their lands be returned to them but the governments did not respond favorably. For example, the Surveyor of General Claims Office of the New Mexico Territory would at times take up to fifty years to process a claim, meanwhile, the lands were being grabbed up by the newcomers. One tactic used to defraud Hispanos from their lands was that they needed to present English language documentation of ownership, which, due to previously being part of Mexico, could only present Spanish language documentation. While the Atchison, Topeka and Santa Fe Railway was built in the 1890s, speculators known as the Santa Fe Ring, orchestrated schemes to dis-land natives from their possessions. In response, Hispanos gathered to reclaim lands taken by the Anglo−Americans. Hoping to scare off the new immigrants, they eventually used intimidation and raids to accomplish their goals. They sought to develop a class-based consciousness among local people through the everyday tactics of resistance to the economic and social order confronting common property land grant communities.  The name comes from the white head coverings many wore.

Tactics
In the early 1890s, a depressed sheep and wool market affected the Northern New Mexico economy adversely. Communal lands dictated by the original land grants were increasingly being split up and fenced off as private land, and pastures were not as plentiful. This was most felt by the Hispano farmers who relied on the communal lands to raise their stock. Las Gorras Blancas tore down fences, burned barns and haystacks, scattered livestock and threatened worse if justice did not prevail. Additionally, a group of Las Gorras Blancas under the direction of Juan Jose Herrera "set thousands of railroad ties afire when the Atchison, Topeka and Santa Fe Railroad refused to raise the low wages it paid" Hispano workers. Moreover, there were numerous demonstrations by men wearing white caps, who rode through the Las Vegas, New Mexico streets at night on horseback, typically ending at the courthouse.

In August 1890 several members of Las Gorras Blancas ran for the New Mexico Legislature in a new populist United People's Party under its Spanish name El Partido del Pueblo Unido. Pablo Herrera, Nestor Montoya, and T.B. Mills were all elected and most forms of direct action that the group was known for ceased. All three were unsuccessful in passing populist legislation and left the state government disillusioned with political reform. Pablo Herrera, in a speech to the State House of Representatives in February 1891, stated:

Pablo Herrera returned to Las Vegas and attempted to revive Las Gorras Blancas but was killed at the behest of Judge Thomas Smith by Deputy Sheriff Felipe Lopez (brother of outgoing San Miguel County Sheriff Lorenzo Lopez) at 9 in the morning of Christmas Eve 1894 in the town plaza of Las Vegas; according to pro-Republican Party newspapers, he had been convicted of killing a political rival during court proceedings in 1891, but escaped to the mountains before sentencing. After the movement died, Juan Jose Herrera attempted to remain active in politics, serving as a member of the board of the so-called "Union Party" (a successor to the United People's Party) up until the time of his death. He died of typhoid fever at 7:15 on the morning of Oct. 10, 1902. Nicanor Herrera lived the quiet life after the death of his brothers, away from the news headlines, until he died aged 82 on May 3, 1930.

In 1890, after 42 years of delay, the US Congress finally did set up the Court of Private Land Claims for New Mexico, Arizona, and Colorado to recognize Mexican and Native lands. Unfortunately by this point, much of the land was lost to lawyers who had demanded land in exchange for legal services. Additionally, the courts removed lumber and grazing land (arguing it wasn’t individual but state land to be made into preserves), and were very conservative in their interpretations of old vague descriptions in the land grants, so the land grants were significantly reduced.

Declaration
In the March 12, 1890, issue of the Las Vegas Optic, Las Gorras Blancas−The White Caps members issued the Proclamation of Las Gorras Blancas:

References

Further reading
Las Gorras Blancas of San Miguel County. New Mexico Office of the State Historian.
Speech by Felix Martinez regarding land and Las Gorras Blancas, Las Vegas Daily Optic, August 18, 1890.
Arellano, Anselmo F. The Never-Ending Land Grant Struggle.
Correia, David. (2010) "Retribution Will Be Their Reward": New Mexico's Las Gorras Blancas and the Fight for the Las Vegas Land Grant Commons. Radical History Review, 2010:108, 49–72. Abstract retrieved November 29, 2010.
Miller, Michael. Las Gorras Blancas: The Roots of Nuevomexicano Activism

New Mexico Territory
Mexican-American history
Gangs in New Mexico
History of San Miguel County, New Mexico
1880s in New Mexico Territory
1890s in New Mexico Territory
Squatting in the United States
1889 establishments in New Mexico Territory